Ptarmigan Peak may refer to:
Ptarmigan Peak (Alaska)
Ptarmigan Peak (Alberta)
Ptarmigan Peak (Colorado)
Ptarmigan Peak (Washington)